Little Creek is a river located in Cayuga County, New York. There is an associated waterfall. It flows into Cayuga Lake by Aurora, New York.

References

Rivers of Cayuga County, New York
Rivers of New York (state)